Someday is a 2021 Indian Hindi-language drama short film written and directed by Shefali Shah, who stars in the lead role.

Plot 
A frontline healthcare worker who returns home for a seven-day quarantine due to the COVID pandemic and spends time interacting through a door with her elderly mother, who suffers from Alzheimer’s disease.

Production
In 2020, Shah decided to experiment with writing and directing in two self-starring COVID-19-based short films, Someday and Happy Birthday Mummy Ji. Someday marked her directorial debut, and Shah conceived the story based on memories from her mother who had turned caregiver to her grandmother, and shot the film with a five-member crew at her residence over a period of two days.

Themes

Release
The film premiered at the 51st USA Film Festival and was later screened at the 18th Indian Film Festival Stuttgart in Germany. In September 2021, it was screened at the Bollywood Festival in Norway.

Reception

Critical response
A critic from Cinestaan wrote that "As the sole artiste in the film, Shah poignantly portrays the pain, grief and emotional turmoil of seeing one's parent slip slowly away into dementia".

References

External links 
Someday at the 2021 Indian Film Festival Stuttgart

Films about women in India
Films about the COVID-19 pandemic
Indian feminist films
2021 short films
2020s Hindi-language films
2021 drama films
Indian short films
Indian direct-to-video films
2021 direct-to-video films
2021 films